Quanhe Subdistrict is a subdistrict situated in the south of Huairou District, Beijing, China. It is located to the north of Longshan Subdistrict, to the east of Huairou Reservoir, and is surrounded by Huairou Town to the other directions. In the year 2020, it had a total population of 78,632.

This subdistrict was founded in 2002. Its name, Quanhe, literally translates to "Spring River".

Administrative divisions 
In 2021, Quanhe Subdistrict consisted of 20 subdivisions — 12 communities and 8 villages:

See also 

 List of township-level divisions of Beijing

References 

Huairou District
Subdistricts of Beijing